The ancient Egyptian child hieroglyph is part of the Egyptian Gardiner's Sign List hieroglyphs for the beginning core subgroup of Man and his Occupations. It relates to the child, and childhood, and has a version for the Pharaoh, as a child.

The hieroglyphic equivalent of the child hieroglyph is nn as a phonogram. It is the ancient Egyptian language equivalent of hrd-(meaning "child"). The hieroglyph is also a determinative in words relating to childhood; (also an abbreviation for "child").

See also
Gardiner's Sign List#A. Man and his Occupations
List of Egyptian hieroglyphs
Harpocrates

References

Betrò, 1995. Hieroglyphics: The Writings of Ancient Egypt, Maria Carmela Betrò, c. 1995, 1996-(English), Abbeville Press Publishers, New York, London, Paris (hardcover)
Budge, 1989, (1929). The Rosetta Stone, E.A.Wallace Budge, (Dover Publications), c 1929, Dover edition(unabridged), 1989. (softcover)

Egyptian hieroglyphs: man and his occupations